Dorsino (Dorsin in local dialect) was a comune (municipality) in Trentino in the northern Italian region Trentino-Alto Adige/Südtirol, located about  west of Trento. It was merged with San Lorenzo in Banale on January 1, 2015, to form a new municipality, San Lorenzo Dorsino.

References

Cities and towns in Trentino-Alto Adige/Südtirol